A Graveyard for Lunatics: Another tale of two cities is a mystery novel by American writer Ray Bradbury, published in 1990. It is the second in a series of three mystery novels that Bradbury wrote featuring a fictionalized version of the author himself as the unnamed narrator.

The novel is set in 1954, when the narrator is working as a writer at a Hollywood motion picture studio, Maximus Films, and reflects Bradbury's experiences working on the movies It Came from Outer Space, King of Kings, and Something Wicked This Way Comes. The studio shares a back wall with an adjoining cemetery (as Paramount Studios really does with Hollywood Forever Cemetery), and most of the story takes place in those two locations.

Two of the novel's characters, stop motion animator Roy Holdstrom and autocratic director Fritz Wong, were based on Bradbury's friends Ray Harryhausen and Fritz Lang + James Wong Howe. Another character, the shy, blond-haired autograph collector Clarence, may be an alternate autobiographical portrait of Bradbury, who as a teenager waited outside Hollywood studios for glimpses of movie stars.

It was preceded by the novel Death Is a Lonely Business, set in 1949, and followed by Let's All Kill Constance, set in 1960.

References

External links
 

1990 American novels
Novels by Ray Bradbury
American mystery novels
Fiction set in 1954
Alfred A. Knopf books
Hollywood novels